Bheja Chokh is a 1988 Bangladeshi drama film edited, written, and directed by Shibli Sadik. The film stars Ilias Kanchan and Champa in the lead roles.

Plot

Cast 
 Ilias Kanchan
 Mithun
 Champa
 Nipa Monalisa

Music

Soundtrack

See also
 Rani Kuthir Baki Itihash
 Biyer Phul

References

1984 films
1984 drama films
Bengali-language Bangladeshi films
Bangladeshi drama films
Films scored by Ahmed Imtiaz Bulbul
1980s Bengali-language films
Films shot in India
1988 drama films
1988 films